The Balmahorn is a mountain of the Pennine Alps, located south of Zwischbergen (Val Divedro) in the canton of Valais. The Balmahorn belongs to the Weissmies massif.

References

External links
 Balmahorn on Hikr

Mountains of the Alps
Mountains of Switzerland
Mountains of Valais
Two-thousanders of Switzerland